Capnodium is a genus of sooty molds in the family Capnodiaceae. It was circumscribed in 1849 by French mycologist Camille Montagne with Capnodium salicinum as the type species.

Species list

References

Capnodiaceae
Dothideomycetes genera
Taxa named by Camille Montagne
Taxa described in 1849